Inland Waterways Authority of India (IWAI) is the statutory authority in charge of the waterways in India. It was constituted under IWAI Act-1985 by the Parliament of India. Its headquarters is located in Noida, Uttar Pradesh.

India has an extensive network of inland waterways in the form of rivers, canals, backwaters and creeks. The total navigable length is 14,500 km, out of which about 5200 km of the river and 4000 km of canals can be used by mechanised crafts. Freight transportation by waterways is highly under-utilised in India compared to other large countries and geographic areas like the United States, China and the European Union. The total cargo moved (in tonne kilometres) by the inland waterway was just 0.1% of the total inland traffic in India, compared to the 21% figure for the United States. Cargo transportation in an organised manner is confined to a few waterways in Goa, West Bengal, Assam, and Kerala.

It does the function of building the necessary infrastructure in these waterways, surveying the economic feasibility of new projects and also administration. On 31 August 2018, IWAI made 13 standardised state-of-art design public for the transportation of cargo and passengers keeping in mind Ganges complex river morphology, hydraulics, acute bends, currents etc. in National Waterway 1. The first implementation will be between Varanasi-Haldia stretch in assistance and investment from the World Bank.

History
Inland Waterways Authority of India was created by the Government of India on 27 October 1986 for development and regulation of Inland waterways for shipping and navigation. The Authority primarily undertakes projects for development and maintenance of Inland Waterway Terminal infrastructure on National Waterways through grant received from Ministry of Ports, Shipping and Waterways, Road Transport and Highways. The head office is at Noida. The Authority also has its regional offices at Patna, Kolkata, Guwahati and Kochi and sub-offices at Prayagraj, Varanasi, Bhagalpur, Farrakka and Kollam.

Classifications & Standards

Budget

Executives
Amita Prasad is the current Chairman of the Authority.

National Waterways

These have been classified into 3 categories based on financial viability and location as well as into 8 clusters based on locations. In first phase, 8 national water (NW) of category-1 that are considered most viable will be developed. There are 60 category II NWs in coastal regions with tidal stretches and feasibility reports for 54 of these (6 are in phase-1) will be delivered from May 2016 onwards

National Waterway 1 

Prayagraj–Haldia stretch of the Ganges–Bhagirathi–Hooghly river system.
 Estd = October 1986
 Length = 
 Fixed terminals = Haldia, Kolkata, Sahibganj, Farrakka and Patna.
 Floating terminals = Haldia, Kolkata, Diamond Harbour, Katwa, Tribeni, Baharampur, Jangipur, Bhagalpur, Munger, Semaria, Doriganj, Ballia, Ghazipur, Chunar, Varanasi and Prayagraj
 Cargo Movement = 4 million tonnes

National Waterway 2

 Sadiya — Dhubri stretch of Brahmaputra river
 Estd = September 1988
 Length = 
 Fixed terminals = Pandu.
 Floating terminals = Dhubri, Jogighopa, Tezpur, Silghat, Dibrugarh, Jamgurhi, Bogibil, Saikhowa and Sadiya
 Cargo Movement = 2 million tonnes

National Waterway 3

 Kozhikode-Kollam stretch of the West Coast Canal, Champakara Canal and Udyogmandal Canal.
 Estd = February 1993
 Length = 
 Fixed terminals = Aluva, Vaikom, Kayamkulam, Kottappuram, Maradu, Cherthala, Thrikkunnapuzha, Kollam and Alappuzha
 Cargo Movement = 1 million tonne

National Waterway 4

 Kakinada–Pudhucherry stretch of canals and the Kaluvelly Tank, Bhadrachalam – Rajahmundry stretch of River Godavari and Wazirabad – Vijayawada stretch of River Krishna
 Estd = November 2008
 Length =

National Waterway 5

 Talcher–Dhamra stretch of the Brahmani River, the Geonkhali - Charbatia stretch of the East Coast Canal, the Charbatia–Dhamra stretch of Matai river and the Mangalgadi - Paradip stretch of the Mahanadi River Delta
 Established = November 2008
 Length =

National Waterway 6

NW-6 is a waterway between Lakhipur and Bhanga of the Barak River.
 In Assam, Lakhipur to Bhanga stretch of  Barak River.
 Estd = 2016
 Length =

See also
 Inland waterways of India
 Waterway
 Transport in India
 The Inland Vessels (Amendment) Act, 2007
 National Highways Authority of India (NHAI)
 Indian Railways

References

External links
Official Website

Ministry of Ports, Shipping and Waterways (India)
Inland waterway authorities
Government agencies established in 1986
Regulatory agencies of India
Waterways in India
1986 establishments in Uttar Pradesh
Transport organisations based in India
Organisations based in Uttar Pradesh

de:Verkehr in Indien